Free is Rick Astley's third studio album, released on 12 March 1991 by RCA Records. It was his first album not to be produced by the noted production team of Stock Aitken Waterman. It gave Astley another hit single in the ballad "Cry for Help", which became a Top 10 in both the UK and US. Further singles "Move Right Out" and "Never Knew Love" were less successful. Free reached the UK Top 10 and the US Top 40 and marked the end of a successful four-year period for Astley.

Track listing
"In the Name of Love" - 4:27 (Michael McDonald)
"Cry for Help" - 4:54 (Rick Astley, Rob Fisher)
"Move Right Out" - 3:50 (Rick Astley, Rob Fisher)
"Be with You" - 4:07 (Rick Astley, Mark King)
"Really Got a Problem" - 4:15 (Rick Astley, Mark King)
"Is This Really Love"† - 3:26 (Rick Astley)
"This Must Be Heaven" - 4:42 (Nicky Brown, Jeffrey Cohen, Jon Lind)
"Never Knew Love" - 3:07 (Derek Bordeaux, John Paul)
"The Bottom Line" - 5:13 (Rick Astley)
"Some Kinda Love" (Japan bonus track) - 4:30 (Rick Astley)
"Wonderful You" - 5:08 (Rick Astley)
"Behind the Smile" - 4:33 (Rick Astley)

Note
† Not on LP PL74896

2010 re-issue
On 3 May 2010 an expanded edition of Free was released in a package containing both newly expanded and remastered editions of Free and Body and Soul.

 "In the Name of Love" – 4:27 
 "Cry for Help" – 4:54 
 "Move Right Out" – 3:50 
 "Be With You" – 4:07 
 "Really Got a Problem" – 4:15 
 "Is This Really Love" – 3:26 
 "This Must Be Heaven" – 4:42 
 "Never Knew Love" – 3:07 
 "The Bottom Line" – 5:13 
 "Wonderful You" – 5:08 
 "Behind the Smile" – 4:33 
 "Some Kinda Love" – 4:26
 "So Glad" – 3:23
 "Cry for Help" (Single Edit) – 4:19
 "Move Right Out" (7" Version) – 3:53
 "Never Knew Love" (7" Remix) – 3:08
 "Cry for Help" (12" Version) – 6:27
 "Move Right Out" (Vox/Strings/Piano Version) – 3:35

Personnel

Musicians 
 Rick Astley – lead and backing vocals
 Dave West – synthesizers (1-8), drum programming (1, 4, 5, 7, 8), acoustic piano (2, 5, 6, 8), organ (2, 3, 7), Fender Rhodes (2, 8, 9)
 Rob Fisher – acoustic piano (3)
 Nichlas Medin – acoustic piano (4, 7, 9)
 Henrik Nilson – organ (4, 9)
 Elton John – acoustic piano (10, 11)
 Paul Halberg – guitars (1)
 Hywel Maggs – guitars (2-5, 7, 8)
 Robert Ahwai – guitars (3, 9, 10)
 Gene Black – guitars (6)
 Lars Danielsson – bass guitar (3, 8)
 Mark King – bass guitar (4)
 Neil Stubenhaus – bass guitar (5)
 Niels-Henning Ørsted Pedersen – double bass (9, 10)
 Jacob Andersen – Latin percussion (1-3, 5-8)
 Vinnie Colaiuta – drums (2, 6)
 Per Lindval – drums (3, 9, 10), drum overdubs (4, 5, 6, 7, 8)
 Anne Dudley – string arrangements and conductor (1-3, 8, 10, 11)
 Jerry Hey – brass arrangements (3, 4, 6, 8, 9)
 Larry Williams – saxophone (3, 4, 6, 8, 9)
 Dan Higgins – saxophone solo (5, 8, 10)
 Bill Reichenbach, Jr. – trombone (3, 4, 6, 8, 9)
 Larry Hall – trumpet (3, 4, 6, 8, 9)
 Kevin Dorsey – backing vocals (1, 8, 10)
 Michael McDonald – backing vocals (1)
 Phil Perry – backing vocals (1, 8, 10)
 The Andraé Crouch Choir – backing vocals (2)
 Carol Kenyon – backing vocals (3, 6-9)
 Dee Lewis – backing vocals (3, 5-9)

Production 
 Producers – Rick Astley and Gary Stevenson
 Engineers – Gary Stevenson and Henrik Nilson 
 Assistant Engineers – Andy Baker, Allan Krohn and Craig Portells. 
 Mixing – Ren Swan 
 Art Direction – Rick Astley 
 Sleeve Design – Mike Orr and the Broughton Design Group.
 Photography – Paul Cox 
 Management – Tony Henderson

Charts

Weekly charts

Year-end charts

Certifications and sales

References

1991 albums
Rick Astley albums
RCA Records albums